Mehmed Merejan is a Bulgarian Romani poet who won the OSI Roma Literary Award with literary distinction for his work Spomen za Utre.

References 

Bulgarian people of Romani descent
Romani poets
Living people
Year of birth missing (living people)
Place of birth missing (living people)